The Woman Hunt is a 1972 film directed by Eddie Romero and starring John Ashley, Pat Woodell, and Sid Haig.

It was the last of several films Romero made for Roger Corman's New World Pictures and is an unofficial remake of Richard Connell's 1924 short story "The Most Dangerous Game".

Plot 
Mercenaries Tony (John Ashley), Silas (Sid Haig) and Karp (Ken Metcalfe) kidnap women and take them to an island, where a wealthy man named Spyros (Eddie Garcia) assembles a group to hunt the women. Tony begins to question what he is doing, and helps McGee (Pat Woodell), Billie (Charlene Jones) and Lori (Laurie Rose) escape. Karp and Silas have a falling out, and Karp kills Silas.

Spyros' head of security, Magda (Lisa Todd), goes after the escapees but is killed in a trap. Billie and Lori are killed during the hunt. Tony and McGee escape to what they think is safety, and go for a romantic swim. Spyros is about to shoot them, but haunted by memories of Magda, kills himself instead.

Cast 
 John Ashley as Tony
 Pat Woodell as McGee
 Sid Haig as Silas
 Charlene Jones as Billie
 Lisa Todd as Magda
 Ken Metcalfe as Karp
 Eddie Garcia as Spyros

Production
Corman approached Ashley to make the film after the success of The Big Doll House (1971), which had been shot in the Philippines. That film's director, Jack Hill, wrote the first draft of the script. Ashley later said that Corman paid for the above-the-line costs while he paid for the below-the-line costs.

Ashley said that the film was originally called Women for Sale.

Filming on The Woman Hunt overlapped with Ashley's Beyond Atlantis.

See also
 List of American films of 1972

References

External links

1970s exploitation films
1972 films
Films directed by Eddie Romero
New World Pictures films
Films about hunters
Films based on short fiction
1970s fantasy films
Films about death games
Films based on thriller novels
1970s English-language films
American action adventure films
American adventure drama films
American exploitation films
1970s American films